Swan Song (Spanish:El canto del cisne) is a 1945 Argentine romantic drama film directed by Carlos Hugo Christensen and starring Mecha Ortiz, Roberto Escalada and Miguel Gómez Bao. The film portrays the ultimately tragic relationship between a young composer and a more mature woman. For her performance Ortiz was awarded the Argentine Film Academy's Silver Condor prize for Best Actress.

Cast
 Mecha Ortiz as Flora Jordán  
 Roberto Escalada as Miguel Angel 
 Miguel Gómez Bao as Mendoza  
 Nicolás Fregues as Leopoldo Jordán  
 Nelly Darén as Susana Jordán  
 Juan Corona as Doctor Menéndez  
 Susana Freyre as Sofía 
 Rita Juárez as Beatriz 
 María Armand as Dora  
 Aurelia Ferrer

References

Bibliography 
 Rist, Peter H. Historical Dictionary of South American Cinema. Rowman & Littlefield, 2014.

External links 

1945 films
Argentine romantic drama films
1945 romantic drama films
1940s Spanish-language films
Films directed by Carlos Hugo Christensen
Films about composers
Argentine black-and-white films
1940s Argentine films